Jareninski Vrh is a dispersed settlement in the Municipality of Pesnica in northeastern Slovenia. It lies along the ridge above Jareninski Dol in the western part of the Slovene Hills. The area is part of the traditional region of Styria and is now included in the Drava Statistical Region. Jarenina Creek flows along the western edge of the settlement.

References

External links
Jareninski Vrh on Geopedia

Populated places in the Municipality of Pesnica